Benjamin Alan Joyce (born September 17, 2000) is an American baseball pitcher in the Los Angeles Angels organization. Joyce was selected by the Angels in the third round of the 2022 Major League Baseball draft.

Amateur career
Joyce grew up in Knoxville, Tennessee and attended Farragut High School.

Joyce enrolled at Walters State Community College along with his twin brother, Zach, and missed his freshman season due to a stress fracture in his elbow. As a sophomore, Joyce went 3–1 with a 4.79 ERA and 35 strikeouts in  innings pitched. Joyce and his brother committed to transfer to Tennessee to continue their college careers. Joyce tore the ulnar collateral ligament during a fall practice and had Tommy John surgery, causing him to miss his first season at Tennessee. On May 1, 2022, he threw the fastest recorded pitch in the history of college baseball with a  fastball. Joyce finished the season with a 2.23 ERA and 53 strikeouts in  innings pitched over 27 appearances.

Professional career
The Los Angeles Angels selected Joyce in the third round in the 2022 Major League Baseball draft. He signed with the Angels on July 22, 2022, and received a $1 million signing bonus. Joyce was assigned to the Double-A Rocket City Trash Pandas to start his professional career. In Joyce's first professional game, he gave up four hits and two earned runs with a strikeout in one inning of relief pitching. He finished his first professional season at 1–0 with a 2.08 ERA, 20 strikeouts, and a save in 13 appearances.

In 2023, the Angels invited Joyce to spring training as a non-roster invitee.

References

External links

Walters State Senators bio
Tennessee Volunteers bio

Living people
Baseball players from Tennessee
Baseball pitchers
Tennessee Volunteers baseball players
Walters State Senators baseball players
2000 births
Rocket City Trash Pandas players